Úlfar is an Icelandic male given name. A mountain Úlfarsfell and river Úlfarsá in Mosfellsbær are named after a settler 'Úlfar'. People bearing the name Úlfar include: 

Úlfar Þórðarson

References

Icelandic masculine given names